CKWO-FM (92.3 FM) is a Canadian radio station that airs  Active rock and aboriginal/First Nations community radio programming broadcasting at 92.3 FM in Fort Frances, Ontario and the Couchiching First Nation. The station is known on the air as The Wolf, which began broadcasting in 2004 and is owned by Couchiching Community Radio.

It is unknown if the station is still broadcasting; the CRTC renewed CKWO-FM's licence from 1 September 2012 to 28 February 2013, with no record of renewal from that date.

On October 12, 2022 WONation Radio Inc. received a license from the CRTC to operate a low-power, English and Ojibway-language Indigenous (Type B Native) FM radio station in Wauzhushk Onigum Nation, District of Kenora, Ontario which would operate at 101.3 MHz (channel 267LP) with an average effective radiated power (ERP) of 27 watts (directional antenna with a maximum ERP of 50 watts with an effective height of antenna above average terrain [EHAAT] of 17.8 metres).

References

External links
 

Kwo
Kwo
Kwo
Radio stations established in 2004
2004 establishments in Ontario